The 1930 Colgate football team was an American football team that represented Colgate University as an independent during the 1930 college football season. In its second season under head coach Andrew Kerr, the team compiled a 9–1 record, shut out seven of ten opponents, and outscored all opponents by a total of 383 to 27. J. Leslie Hart was the team captain. The team played its home games on Whitnall Field in Hamilton, New York.

Schedule

References

Colgate
Colgate Raiders football seasons
Colgate football